Sa Re Ga Ma Pa L'il Champs 2022 is the ninth season of kids singing reality show Sa Re Ga Ma Pa L'il Champs which is based on India's longest running reality show Sa Re Ga Ma Pa.

Programming
The show went for Ground auditions in the month of July and ended up in August. The show premiered on 15 October 2022 on Zee TV and Zee5 simultaneously at 21:00 IST.

Contestant Status

Judges and host
The show is judged by Music Composer Anu Malik, Indian playback singer Neeti Mohan and singer, composer Shankar Mahadevan.  The show is hosted by Indian Comedian and TV personality Bharti Singh.

Grand jury
The following people are part of the grand jury for the season:

 Padma Wadekar
 Pawni Pandey
 Arvinder Singh Arv
 Vinod Hasal
 Suzanne Dmello
 Debojit Saha
 Sumedha Karmahe
 Sanjeevani Bhelande
 Abhay Jodhpurkar
 Aneek Dhar
 Sanchita Bhattacharya
 Ram Shankar
 Vaishali mhade
 Ami Mishra
 Farhad Bhiwandiwala
 Bhavya Pandit
 Raman Mahadevan
 Kiran kamath
 Arpita mukherjee
 Sarfaraz Ahme
 Vipin Aneja
 Rishikesh Kamerkar
 Shabbir Ahmed
 Hamsika Mani
 Sudhakar Sharma
 Ghanshyam Vaswani
 Murtuza Mustafa
 Sunil Das
 Qadir Mustafa
 Soham Chakraborty
 Hrishikesh Chury
 Sandeep Thakur
 Tuheen Chakravorty
 Paroma Dasgupta dg
 Pradip Saran
 Shabab Sabri
 Shehnaz Akthar
 Rupali Jagga
 Ankush Bhardwaj
 Raktima Mukherjee
 Nanu Gurjar
 Sachin Kumar Valmiki
 Uvie

Guest

References

Indian reality television series
Singing talent shows